The women's 200 metres at the 2010 African Championships in Athletics were held on July 31–August 1.

Medalists

Results

Heats
Qualification: First 3 of each heat (Q) and the next 4 fastest (q) qualified for the semifinals.

Semifinals
Qualification: First 3 of each semifinal (Q) and the next 2 fastest (q) qualified for the final.

Final
Wind: +1.10 m/s

External links
Results

200
200 metres at the African Championships in Athletics
2010 in women's athletics